The Challengers was a Canadian biographical television series which aired on CBC Television from 1979 to 1980.

Premise
This series profiled various successful Canadians. Its debut on 26 January 1979 featured a winning squash player, a rodeo performer and a hockey skate blade inventor.

Scheduling
The half-hour series was broadcast Fridays at 10:00 p.m. (Eastern) from 26 January to 30 March 1979. Additional special hour-long episodes were broadcast in 1980, on 11 January, 8 February and 2 April.

References

External links
 

CBC Television original programming
1979 Canadian television series debuts
1980 Canadian television series endings
1970s Canadian documentary television series
1980s Canadian documentary television series